St. Jadwiga's Church in Brzeg, Poland, is a Gothic castle church built in the fourteenth-century.

The Gothic brick-built chapel, adjoined to the south-western portion of Brzeg Castle was built in the former location of a collegiate church of St Hedwig built between 1368 and 1369. In 1741, the chapel was destroyed due to Prussian bombardment, with only the presbytery having had survived. After its reconstruction in 1783-1784, the chapel served as the mausoleum for the Silesian Piasts (after 1945, 22 sarcophagi were found in the crypt). The chapel suffered damage during World War II, and was reconsecrated as a church in 1989.

Presently, the sarcophagi are located in the adjoined Silesian Piasts Brzeg Castle Museum.

See also
Brzeg Castle
Holy Cross Church, Brzeg
St. Nicholas' Church, Brzeg

References

Basilica churches in Poland
Brzeg County
Brzeg